António Lino de Sousa Horta Osório (born 21 December 1933, in Lisbon, Mercês) is a Portuguese lawyer and sportsman.

He is the son of António de Sousa Horta Sarmento Osório and second wife Maria da Glória Ferreira Lino da Silva.

Life
A Dr. Licentiate in Law from the University of Lisbon and a lawyer, he was 25 times National Champion of table tennis for his club Sporting Clube de Portugal.

Family
He married in Lisbon, São João de Deus, on 28 June 1962 Adélia Maria de Mendonça Mota (born Lisbon, 27 March 1944), daughter of Dr. Carlos Cecílio Nunes Góis Mota and Sofia da Assunção de Mendonça, and had four children:
 António Mota de Sousa Horta Osório (born Lisbon, 28 January 1964)
 Sofia Maria de Mendonça de Sousa Horta Osório (born Lisbon, 23 May 1975)
 Inês Maria de Mendonça de Sousa Horta Osório (born Lisbon, 25 September 1976)
 Carlos Eduardo Mota de Sousa Horta Osório (born Lisbon, 5 March 1978)

References and notes

Sources
 Domingos de Araújo Affonso and Rui Dique Travassos Valdez, Livro de Oiro da Nobreza, J. A. Telles da Sylva, 2.ª edição, Lisboa, 1988, Volume III, pp. 235 and 240
 José Carlos de Ataíde de Tavares, Amarais Osórios – Senhores da Casa de Almeidinha, Edição do Author, 1.ª Edição, Lisboa, 1986, pp. 364–366
 Various, Anuário da Nobreza de Portugal, III, 1985, Tomo II, pp. 390–391 and 1,054
 Various, Anuário da Nobreza de Portugal, III, 2006, Tomo III, pp. 1,072–1,575
 António Lino de Sousa Horta Osório in a Portuguese Genealogical site

1937 births
Living people
20th-century Portuguese lawyers
Portuguese nobility
Portuguese male table tennis players
People from Lisbon